Alain Hernández (born 13 December 1975) is a Spanish actor. He has appeared in more than forty films since 2007, and has also worked in television.

Selected filmography

References

External links 

1975 births
Living people
Spanish male film actors
Spanish male television actors
21st-century Spanish male actors